Leucophoebe albaria is a species of beetle in the family Cerambycidae. It was described by Henry Walter Bates in 1872. It is known from Colombia and Nicaragua.

References

Hemilophini
Beetles described in 1872